Vexillum gaudryi is an extinct species of sea snail, a marine gastropod mollusk, in the family Costellariidae, the ribbed miters.

Distribution
Fossils of this marine species were found in Eocene strata in Ile-de-France, France.

References

 Cossmann (M.) & Pissarro (G.), 1911 - Iconographie complète des coquilles fossiles de l'Éocène des environs de Paris, t. 2, p. pl. 26-45 (
 Le Renard, J. & Pacaud, J. (1995). Révision des mollusques Paléogènes du Bassin de Paris. II. Liste des références primaires des espèces. Cossmanniana. 3: 65–132.

External links
 de Raincourt, A. (1884). Note sur les gisements fossilifères des sables moyens. Bulletin de la Société Géologique de France, troisième série. 12: 340-346

gaudryi
Gastropods described in 1884